Saint-Nicolas-lès-Cîteaux is a commune in the Côte-d'Or department in eastern France.

Cîteaux Abbey is located in the commune.

Geography

Climate
Saint-Nicolas-lès-Cîteaux has a oceanic climate (Köppen climate classification Cfb).

Population

Town partnerships
Saint-Nicolas-lès-Cîteaux fosters partnerships with the following places:
 Roth, Rhineland-Palatinate, Germany since 1 June 1991

See also
Communes of the Côte-d'Or department

References

Communes of Côte-d'Or